Samuel, Sammy or Sam Day may refer to:

 Samuel Day (sportsman) (1878–1950), English cricketer and footballer, known as Sammy Day
 Samuel S. Day (1808–1871), Canadian-born American Baptist missionary
 Samuel T. Day (1838–1877), American physician, plantation owner and politician
 Sam Day (jockey) (1802–1866), English jockey and uncle of
 Sam Day, Jr. (1818–1838), English jockey
 Sam Day (Australian rules footballer) (born 1992), Australian rules footballer
 Sammy Day, the title character of the Belgium comic series Sammy
 Sam Day (rugby league) (born 1994), rugby league player